Yengeh Qaleh (also Romanized as Yengeh Qal‘eh) is a village in the Sangar Rural District, in the Central District of Faruj County, North Khorasan Province, Iran. In the 2006 census, its population was 717, with 161 families.

References 

Populated places in Faruj County